Kris Anka is an American comics artist and inker, best known for his work with Marvel Comics on X-Men, Runaways, Captain Marvel, and his 2014 re-design of Spider-Woman. In 2016, Anka illustrated the new Star-Lord ongoing series, which was written by Chip Zdarsky. He is currently working full time as a character designer on the sequel to Spider-Man: Into the Spider-Verse.

Bibliography

Marvel Comics
 A+X #10 (2013)
 All-New X-Men Special #1
 All-New Ghost Rider #12 (with Felipe Smith) (2014)
 Captain Marvel Vol 9, #1-10 (2016)
 Secret Wars: Secret Love, "Win A Date with Thor" (2015)
 Spider-Verse #2 (2015)
 Uncanny X-Men #11, 15, 23, 24, 26, 28, 33, 34, 600 (2013-2015)
 Wolverine Vol 6, #8-9 (2014)
 Wolverines #7 (2015)
 X-Men Vol 4, #10-12 (2013)
 X-Men: Battle of the Atom #10 (2013)
 Star-Lord #1-6 (2016-2017)
 The Punisher #13 (2017)
 Runaways #1-12, 15-18 (2017-2019)
 Black Cat #9-10 (2020)

DC Comics
 Young Justice #5 (2019)

Covers

 Age of Apocalypse #7-12 (2012)
 All-New X-Factor #1-20 (2014)
 Amazing X-Men Vol 2, #7, 14-16 (2014)
 Beauties #1 (2016)
 Deadpool Vol 3, #13-14 (2013)
 Fresh Romance #7 (2015)
 Glory #27, 30 (2012)
 Gwenpool Special #1 (2016)
 House of M Vol 2, #1-4 (2015)
 The Hypernaturals #2-3, 7–9, 11 (2012)
 Ms. Marvel #10-12, 15-19 (2014)
 New Mutants #37-41 (2009)
 True Believers: The Groovy Deadpool #1 (2016)
 Uncanny Avengers #5 (2015)
 Uncanny X-Force #1-5, 7-14 (2013)
 X-Factor #249 (2013)
 Wolverine and the X-Men, variant #37 (2013)

References

External links
 Kris Anka on Tumblr
 Kris Anka on Twitter
 Kris Anka at Marvel.com
Kris Anka on IMDb

Living people
American comics artists
Year of birth missing (living people)